Wilburn is an unincorporated community and census-designated place (CDP) in Cleburne County, Arkansas, United States. Wilburn has a post office with ZIP code 72179.

It was first listed as a CDP in the 2020 census with a population of 132.

District 64 State Representative John Russell Payton, a Republican and an automobile dealer in Beebe, maintains his state office in Wilburn.

The Concord School District operates area schools, including Concord High School. On July 1, 2004, the Wilburn School District consolidated into the Concord School District.

Demographics

2020 census

Note: the US Census treats Hispanic/Latino as an ethnic category. This table excludes Latinos from the racial categories and assigns them to a separate category. Hispanics/Latinos can be of any race.

References

Unincorporated communities in Cleburne County, Arkansas
Unincorporated communities in Arkansas
Census-designated places in Cleburne County, Arkansas
Census-designated places in Arkansas